Deacon Avakum (Serbian Cyrillic: Ђакон Авакум; 1794 – 30 December 1814) was a Serbian Orthodox monk who inspired his people to rise against the Ottoman Empire and in so doing suffered a martyr's death. His name was added by the Serbian Orthodox Church to the Calendar of Saints.

Avakum is the Serbian language translation of the name Habakkuk.

Biography
Born in Bosnia in 1794, Lepoje was his Christian name at baptism. When Lepoje was still young, his father died. His mother took him to the Moštanica Monastery, near Banja Luka, where Lepoje's uncle was the abbot. There he was educated and later became a monk, taking the name of Avakum. At eighteen, he was an ordained deacon.

In 1809, the monks of the Mošatanica Monastery who took part in an unsuccessful revolt against the Turks had to flee to another monastery in Trnava, a village near Čačak, where the Hegumen was Pajsije.

After the failed Karađorđe’s revolt in 1813, the Turks began a reign of terror against the Serbs. The people decided to attempt yet another revolt, this time under Hadži-Prodan Gligorijević, and the monks of the Trnava village became actively involved, among them were deacon Avakum, hegumen Pajsije, hieromonk Genadije, and priest Radovan Vujović. The rebellion took place on the Feast of the Cross (September 14), but it was crushed by the Turks. Many people were captured, and some were executed on the spot as a warning to others while the rest were sent to Belgrade to face charges. Among the prisoners were Avakum and Pajsije. The Turks offered to free anyone who would convert to Islam. Some of the prisoners agreed to this, but the majority refused to deny Christ, and so they were put to death, including Avakum and Pajsije.

Saint Avakum the deacon is commemorated on December 17 along with Saint Pajsije.

References 

1794 births
1814 deaths
People from Dubica, Bosnia and Herzegovina
Serbs of Bosnia and Herzegovina
Serbian Orthodox clergy
Serbian saints of the Eastern Orthodox Church
Persecution of Serbs
Persecution of Eastern Orthodox Christians
Persecution of Christians in the Ottoman Empire
Christian saints killed by Muslims
Christians executed for refusing to convert to Islam
19th-century Eastern Orthodox martyrs
19th-century Christian saints
Hieromartyrs
People executed by impalement